Janakpur was one of the fourteen zones of Nepal, reaching from the Indian border in the south to the Tibetan border in the north and Sagarmatha Zone in the east and Bagmati and Naryani Zones in the west.

The headquarters of Janakpur Zone and its main city was Janakpur.  Close to the Indian border, it is a historic city of Hinduism. The city is believed to have been the capital city of King Janaka, the father-in-law of Lord Rama, the son of the then king of Ayodhya, Dasharatha. The city was then called 'Mithila Nagari'. The name of Janakpur zone is related to the historic King Janaka and his capital Janakpur.

Other cities within Janakpur Zone are Kamalamai (in Inner Terai) and Bhimeshwor and Bardibas, Dhalkebar, Jaleshwor, Malangwa, Hariwan, Lalbandi, Gaushala Bazar and Matihani (Outer Terai).

Administrative subdivisions
Janakpur was divided into six districts; since 2015 the three northern districts have been redesignated as part of Bagmati Province, while the three southern districts have been redesignated as part of Province No. 2.

See also
 Development Regions of Nepal (Former)
 List of zones of Nepal (Former)
 List of districts of Nepal

 
Zones of Nepal
Madhesh Province
Bagmati Province
2015 disestablishments in Nepal